Utopia bootdisk is a booting program released on June 22, 2000 and created by the warez group Utopia, designed for playing pirated Sega Dreamcast games on standard CD-R discs. The bootdisk also allows the play of imported official Dreamcast GD-ROMs, bypassing the Dreamcast's region lockout. The Utopia bootdisk does not defeat the security used on original GD-ROM disks; instead, it uses an alternative boot method in the Dreamcast BIOS, which was originally intended for use with MIL-CDs. When loaded into a standard Dreamcast, the screen will display a spinning 3-D rendering of a reindeer alongside a message to insert a disc. Once a new disc is inserted and the Dreamcast lid is closed, the disc boots. Eventually, the bootdisk was rendered obsolete by "self-booting" pirate releases—games released in MIL-CD format that could boot without the need of the Utopia bootdisk. The bootdisk was developed using a pirated version of the Sega Katana SDK, with code to render the reindeer taken from an early Dreamcast teapot demo.

See also
 Dreamshell
 KallistiOS

References

Video game boot disks